Phyllopetalia excrescens is a species of dragonfly in the family Austropetaliidae. It is endemic to Chile. Its natural habitats are intermittent rivers and freshwater springs. It is threatened by habitat loss.

References

Austropetaliidae
Fauna of Chile
Odonata of South America
Taxonomy articles created by Polbot
Endemic fauna of Chile